Jorge Antonio Carrasco Chirino (born February 1, 1982) is a Chilean former footballer.

His professional debut came in 2001 with Audax after spending time in their youth system. He made the switch to Colo-Colo from Audax with teammates Rodolfo Moya and Roberto Cereceda in the summer of 2007. Carrasco has become a regular with the Colo-Colo's first team.

He represented Chile at the 1999 South American Under 17 Football Championship, which took place in Uruguay, and at the 2004 CONMEBOL Men Pre-Olympic Tournament, which took place in Chile.

Titles

Club
Colo-Colo
 Primera División de Chile (1): 2007 Clausura

Club statistics

External links
 
 

1982 births
Living people
Chilean people of Italian descent
Footballers from Santiago
Chilean footballers
Chilean Primera División players
Primera B de Chile players
Audax Italiano footballers
Colo-Colo footballers
Club Deportivo Palestino footballers
Universidad de Concepción footballers
Association football defenders